Dar-e Nadun (also Romanized as Dar-e Nadūn) is a village in Sarbanan Rural District, in the Central District of Zarand County, Kerman Province, Iran. At the 2006 census, its population was 11, in 4 families.

References 

Populated places in Zarand County